Bounty Hunters is a British comedy drama series that first aired on 25 October 2017 on Sky One. Pairing an odd couple together in a series of mishaps. Barnaby is a mild mannered and often bumbling son of an antiques dealer in England, while Nina is a tough American Bounty hunter from New York, who both find themselves trying to save their respective families from a Mexican cartel.

Cast

 Jack Whitehall as Barnaby Walker
 Rosie Perez as Nina Morales
 Charity Wakefield as Leah Walker
 Robert Lindsay as Nigel Walker
 Sophie Thompson as Fiona Walker
 Olga Merediz as Maria
 Daniella Piper as Sofia
 Ian Gerard Whyte as Uri
 Gabriel "G-Rod" Rodriguez as Pancho
 Christian Ochoa as Angel
 Amber Agar as DI Suleiman
 Ben Bailey Smith as DS Evans
 Bradley James as Webb Sherman
 Bradley James as Keegan Sherman
 Daniel Faraldo as Alejandro
 Jacqueline King as Penelope

Episodes

Season 1 (2017)

Season 2 (2019)

External links

2017 British television series debuts
2019 British television series endings
2010s British comedy television series
English-language television shows
Sky UK original programming
Television series by Tiger Aspect Productions
Television shows set in England